The National Convention of Progressive Democrats is a political party in Burkina Faso (former Upper Volta. 
At the last legislative elections, 5 May 2002, the party won 2.0% of the popular vote and 2 out of 111 seats.

Political parties in Burkina Faso